Anders Flodqvist (born 24 November 1959) is a Swedish water polo player. He competed in the men's tournament at the 1980 Summer Olympics.

See also
 Sweden men's Olympic water polo team records and statistics
 List of men's Olympic water polo tournament goalkeepers

References

External links
 

1959 births
Living people
Sportspeople from Stockholm
Swedish male water polo players
Water polo goalkeepers
Olympic water polo players of Sweden
Water polo players at the 1980 Summer Olympics